Lt Gen Ben Raubenheimer  is a retired South African Army officer who served as Chief of Staff Finance for the South African Defence Force from 1993 and South African National Defence Force in 1994 before his retirement in 1999.

Army career 
He was promoted to Lieutenant General in 1993.

Awards and decorations

References

South African generals
Living people
Year of birth missing (living people)